is an active volcano on the Japanese isle of Izu Ōshima. Although the volcano is predominantly basaltic, major eruptions have occurred at intervals of 100–150 years.

History

The eruption had a Volcanic Explosivity Index of 3, and involved a central vent eruption, radial fissure eruption, explosive eruption, lava flows, and a lava lake eruption. There was also a 16 km high subplinian plume. All of the island's 12,000 inhabitants were evacuated by dozens of vessels consisting of both the military and civilian volunteers.

The most recent eruption was in 1990.

Suicide
From a vantage point near the top of the cone it was once possible to leap into the crater. As a result, the volcano became a popular venue for suicides. Beginning in the 1920s, several suicides occurred in the volcano every week. The most notable death by suicide is Kiyoko Matsumoto who tossed herself into Mihara's fiery pit due to her homosexuality, then-considered taboo at the time. Matsumoto, a young student who was in a relationship with fellow student Masako Tomita, traveled to the rim of the volcano where both intended to take their lives, with only Matsumoto herself doing so. After the incident, the suicide toll skyrocketed to 944 that year alone. Authorities eventually erected a fence around the base of the structure to curb the number of suicides.

Mihara in popular culture

Mt Mihara has been featured numerous times in fiction. In 1965, Oshima Island and the volcano itself appeared in the climax of Gamera's debut film, where the military lured the giant turtle there as a means to trap it in a giant rocket-ship built on the island.

Mount Mihara was the place where the Japanese government imprisoned Godzilla in the movie The Return of Godzilla. Five years later, in the sequel Godzilla vs. Biollante, bombs placed on Mt. Mihara go off and release Godzilla from his fiery tomb.

In the novel Ring by Koji Suzuki and its subsequent film adaption, Shizuko Yamamura, the mother of Sadako, predicted that Mount Mihara would someday erupt using her psychic abilities. After a failed psychic demonstration which resulted in Sadako psychically murdering a reporter, Shizuko became depressed and ultimately insane and committed suicide by leaping into the crater of Mount Mihara.

Bibliography
 Night Falls Fast: Understanding Suicide by Kay Redfield Jamison, Vintage Books 2000

References

External links

 Izu-Oshima - Japan Meteorological Agency 
  - Japan Meteorological Agency
 Izu Oshima - Geological Survey of Japan

Mountains of Tokyo
Stratovolcanoes of Japan
Izu–Bonin–Mariana Arc
Active volcanoes
Volcanoes of Tokyo
Suicide in Japan